Joseph Desire Mawaye (born May 14, 1986 in Douala) is a Cameroonian footballer.

Career

Club
His previous club was Kasımpaşa in the Süper Lig, who played as Desire Yosuef.

He was released from Arka Gdynia on 30 June 2011. He plays for the club Respect United, who fights against Racism in Germany.

References

External links
 

1986 births
Living people
Cameroonian footballers
Cameroonian expatriate footballers
Kasımpaşa S.K. footballers
Kadji Sports Academy players
Arka Gdynia players
Süper Lig players
Ekstraklasa players
Expatriate footballers in Turkey
Expatriate footballers in Poland
Association football forwards